Erpeldange is a village in the commune of Wiltz, in northern Luxembourg. , the town has a population of 254.

Villages in Luxembourg
Wiltz (canton)